Tennis was contested at the 2015 Summer Universiade from July 4 to 12 at the Tennis Academy in Gwangju, South Korea. Men's and women's singles, men's and women's team, and men's, women's, and mixed doubles events was contested.

Medal summary

Medal table

Medal events

See also
 Tennis at the Summer Universiade

References

External links
2015 Summer Universiade – Tennis

 
2015
Summer Universiade
2015 Summer Universiade events